Ashley Liao (born October 21, 2001) is an American actress. She began her career as a child actress in the series Fuller House and The Kicks. She has since appeared in the Disney+ film Secret Society of Second-Born Royals and the Apple TV+ series Physical.

Early life and education
Liao was born in Orange County, California, United States on 21 October 2001 into a Chinese family. She started acting in local musical theater productions when she was in fifth grade, landing the role of Dorothy in The Wizard of Oz in her second ever production. She pursued an associate's degree graduating with a 4.0 before going on to study Communication at UCLA. She also sings on YouTube.

Career
After signing with an agent in 2013, Liao began her professional career with a guest appearances in Bad Teacher, followed by guest appearances in Fresh Off the Boat and Nicky, Ricky, Dicky & Dawn.

In 2016, she landed the role of Mandy in Debby Ryan produced Disney XD film Jessica Darling's It List. Liao played the role of Lola Wong in the Netflix spin-off of Full House, Fuller House for its first three seasons. She was promoted to series regular for season two. She also had a recurring role as Parker Zhao in season one of the Amazon Prime Video series The Kicks.

In 2019, she appeared in the Netflix film Always Be My Maybe as a younger version of Ali Wong's character. She also starred in the 2020 Disney+ film Secret Society of Second Born Royals as Princess Eleanor.

Liao played Simone in the 2021 Apple TV+ series Physical. In November 2021, it was announced Liao would star opposite Ross Butler in the film adaptation of Abigail Hing Wen's Loveboat, Taipei.

Filmography

Film

Television

References

External links
 

Living people
2001 births
21st-century American actresses
Actresses from Orange County, California
American actresses of Chinese descent
American child actresses